The Morón Fault System or Morón Fault Zone is a complex of geological faults located in northern Venezuela and the adjacent Caribbean Sea. The fault system is of right-lateral strike-slip. The fault forms part of the diffuse boundary between the Caribbean and South American tectonic plates. The existence of this fault was hypothesized as early as 1888.

See also
Vargas tragedy

References

Geography of Miranda (state)
Geography of Vargas (state)
Seismic faults of Venezuela
Strike-slip faults
Venezuelan Coastal Range